Something More is a 1999 Canadian comedy film directed by Rob W. King. It stars Michael A. Goorjian, Chandra West, David Lovgren and Jennifer Beals. The film was written by Peter Bryant, and produced by Minds Eye Entertainment.

Plot summary 
A group of friends in their late 20s play for a church basketball team. Two of them compete for the affections of a woman.

Production 
The film was shot in Saskatchewan.

Cast 

 Michael A. Goorjian as Sam
 Chandra West as Kelly
 David Lovgren as Jim
 Tom Cavanagh as Harry
 Peter Flemming as Dan
 Kurt Max Runte as Will
 Nathaniel DeVeaux as Coach Louie
 Jennifer Beals as Lisa

Reception 
Ken Eisner, writing for Variety, said it was an "amiable, undemanding comedy." Marc Horton of the Edmonton Journal wrote that the dialogue was not believable and that the resolution was too predictable. Liam Lacey of The Globe & Mail wrote "Something More could have been played as an embittered little satire along the lines of About Last Night or Your Friends and Neighbors. As such, it probably would have been a more interesting movie. As it stands, it's really just a commercial calling card -- a way for novice feature director Rob King and the film's Canadian producers to show that they too can create perfectly competent, undemanding diversions."

References

External links 

Canadian basketball films
Canadian romantic comedy films
Canadian independent films
English-language Canadian films
1999 films
1999 comedy films
Canadian sports comedy films
1990s English-language films
Films directed by Rob W. King
1990s Canadian films